Cong Wenjing (born December 1962) is a former Chinese politician who spent most of his career in Jiangxi.  As of November 2014 he was under investigation by the Communist Party's anti-corruption agency. Previously he served as the Mayor of Xinyu.

Chinese media reported that he had close relations with Su Rong, who was one of the vice-chairmen of the Chinese People's Political Consultative Conference (CPPCC).

Life and career
Cong was born and raised in Fengtai County, Anhui. He earned a Master of Engineering degree from Wuhan University.

Cong is a member of the Chinese Communist Party, he entered the workforce in August 1983. He worked in a factory before teaching school as a physical education teacher.

In July 2001 he became the vice-mayor of Jingdezhen, he remained in that position until June 2004, when he was transferred to Xinyu and appointed the head of Propaganda Department of Xinyu Municipal Party Committee and a standing committee of Xinyu Municipal committee of the CPC. In January 2006, he served as secretary of the Xinyu Municipal Politics and Law Commission, then he was promoted to deputy party chief in July 2010. In August 2013, he was appointed the vice-mayor and acting mayor of Xinyu, he became the mayor on September 23, 2013.

On November 29, 2014, he was being investigated by the Party's internal disciplinary body for "serious violations of laws and regulations".

References

External links

1962 births
Chinese Communist Party politicians from Anhui
Living people
Political office-holders in Jiangxi
People's Republic of China politicians from Anhui
Politicians from Huainan
Mayors of places in China